California Proposition 10 may refer to:
 California Proposition 10 (1998)
 California Proposition 10 (2008)